Charles II Gonzaga (22 October 1609 – 30 August 1631) was the son of Charles I, Duke of Mantua, and Catherine de Lorraine-Guise (also known as Catherine de Mayenne). He was the Duke of Nevers and Rethel, together with his father.

In 1621, he succeeded his uncle Henri de Lorraine-Guise as Duke of Mayenne.
In 1627 he married his cousin Maria Gonzaga, Marquise of Montferrat and heiress to the Duchy of Mantua. However, Cesare II Gonzaga, Duke of Guastalla and Emperor Ferdinand II rejected her claim to Mantua, leading to the War of Mantuan Succession (1628–1631).

Charles was never Duke of Mantua since he died at Cavriana six years before his father. When the latter died in 1637, Charles's eight-year-old son, Charles II, became Duke of Mantua, his widow Maria acting as regent. His daughter Eleonora became Holy Roman Empress.

Family
In December 1627 he married his cousin Maria Gonzaga, the marriage being arranged by Vincenzo II Gonzaga.

Charles and Maria had:
Maria Gonzaga
Charles II, Duke of Mantua and Montferrat (1629–1665).
Eleonora (1630–1686), who married in 1651 Ferdinand III, Holy Roman Emperor.

Ancestry

References

Sources

1609 births
1631 deaths
Charles
Heirs apparent who never acceded
Nobility from Paris
17th-century Italian nobility
17th-century peers of France
Sons of monarchs
Dukes of Mayenne